Dick Lammi (January 15, 1909 – November 29, 1969) was an American jazz tubist and bassist associated with Dixieland jazz.

Lammi played violin and banjo early in his career, and played as a banjoist in various groups in the Pacific Northwest in the late 1920s. He settled in Portland, Oregon in the early 1930s, and played bass in a group there; after a move to San Francisco in 1936, he began playing tuba alongside bass. His best-known work was as a member of Lu Watters's band, the Yerba Buena Jazz Band. Lammi played in the ensemble from 1941 to 1950, including on virtually all of their recordings.

In the 1950s, Lammi worked with Bob Scobey, Turk Murphy, Wally Rose, and Clancy Hayes. He recorded little after the early 1960s, and his exact date of death is disputed.

Discography
With Turk Murphy
 The Music of Jelly Roll Morton (Columbia, 1954)
 When the Saints Go Marching In (Columbia, 1954)
 Barrelhouse Jazz (Columbia, 1955)
 New Orleans Jazz Festival (Columbia, 1956)
 New Orleans Shuffle (Columbia, 1957)
 George Lewis & Turk Murphy at Newport (Verve, 1957)

With others
 Clancy Hayes, Clancy Hayes Sings (Verve, 1957)
 Lu Watters, Live from the Dawn Club (Fairmont, 1973)
 Lu Watters, Live at Hambone Kelly's (G.H.B., 1994)

References
Scott Yanow, [ Dick Lammi] at Allmusic

American jazz tubists
American male jazz musicians
American jazz double-bassists
Male double-bassists
1969 deaths
1909 births
20th-century American musicians
American jazz banjoists
20th-century tubists
20th-century double-bassists
20th-century American male musicians
Yerba Buena Jazz Band members